Jérôme Cyrill Kym (born 12 February 2003) is a Swiss professional tennis player.

Kym represents Switzerland at the Davis Cup, where he has a W/L record of 1–0. He defeated Evgeny Donskoy and Andrey Rublev in his first doubles tie, alongside Henri Laaksonen.

References

External links
 
 

2003 births
Living people
Swiss male tennis players
People from Rheinfelden District
Sportspeople from Aargau